Gaétan Cathelineau (1787–1859) was a French painter of portraits and of historical and genre subjects.

Life
Cathelineau was born at Montrichard (Loir-et-Cher) in 1787. He was a pupil of Jacques-Louis David, and professor of drawing at the Lyceum of Tours from 1835 to 1858. He died at Tours in 1859, bequeathing to the Museum of that city fifty pictures by different masters, as well as eleven by his own hand.

References

Sources
 

18th-century French painters
French male painters
19th-century French painters
People from Loir-et-Cher
1787 births
1859 deaths
Pupils of Jacques-Louis David
18th-century French male artists